Sahil Salathia is an Indian Actor.

Early life and education
Sahil hails from a Rajput family in Jammu city, the state of Jammu and Kashmir. Sahil did his schooling at Apeejay, Sheikh Sarai in Delhi and is a software Engineer from the Punjab University, Chandigarh. Sahil is also a trained actor from Barry John Acting School.

Modeling
Sahil represented India at Mr. Asia 2012 in Hong Kong and was a finalist (Top 5) amongst 32 Asian and Euro-Asian countries. Sahil has been the face for many popular brands and has also done brand campaigns for almost fifty leading brands in India, some of the brands are; Idea Cellular, Tata Indicom, Kingfisher, Big Bazaar and Mercedes Benz, etc. He has also appeared in all the leading magazines such as Maxim, GQ and Hello to name a few, as well as on the cover of India Today and Men's Health India. He has done around 20 commercials in India and abroad. His latest television commercials include Tata Tetley Green Tea, Lava Mobile Phones, Tata Indica, Samsung laptops, Loop mobiles and is continuing.

Career
He made his acting debut, as the male lead in Ashutosh Gowariker's Everest, where he gets to play an extremely layered character of a celebrated mountaineer called Arjun Sabharwal. He was particularly excited to be represented by the great combo of ace director Ashutosh Gowariker and A. R. Rahman, the Oscar-winning music director who has done the background score for Everest. Sahil was recently awarded the Best Fresh Face by the Lion Gold Awards for his extremely appreciated portrayal of Arjun on screen. A sought-after face in the Indian entertainment circuit, he made his Bollywood film debut on the big screen with Ashutosh Gowarikar's Panipat. He is the pride of Jammu and an inspiration to many that hard work and perseverance pays off.

Filmography

Films

Television

Web series

Social causes

Apart from acting and modeling, Sahil is also involved in social causes. In the year 2014, he arranged for a fun filled day for the underprivileged kids from a NGO, Smile Foundation during Christmas.

He also flagged off the "Chal Kar Pahal" walkathon to support gender equality, women empowerment in Bhopal, Lucknow and Chandigarh

References

Indian male film actors
Indian male models
Male actors in Hindi cinema
Male actors from Jammu and Kashmir
21st-century Indian male actors
1988 births
Dogra people
Living people
Apeejay School alumni
People from Jammu and Kashmir